(also written 2015 XY261) is an Apollo near-Earth asteroid that is also a Mars crosser. It is roughly 10–22 meters in diameter and passed less than 1 lunar distance,  from Earth on 15 December 2015.

2015 flyby
This small dim asteroid approached Earth in opposition, having an elongation from the Sun of over 160 degrees from mid November 2015. However, due to its absolute magnitude even though it had a very low phase angle during the approach it was too dim for contemporary telescopes to spot it so early, as it was significantly fainter than apparent magnitude 23. However it got brighter as it approached and a few weeks later, on 6 December 2015 it was spotted by Pan-STARRS at an apparent magnitude of 21.5 using a  Ritchey–Chrétien telescope.

On 15 December 2015 at 13:52 UT, the asteroid passed  from the Earth and three and a half hours later at 17:17 UT passed  from the Moon.

This flyby is notable because the discovery was 9 days prior to closest approach. This is one of the earliest discoveries of an asteroid during approach. Discounting cataloged objects which were discovered during previous orbits, most asteroids are discovered with little or no warning.  was the only asteroid to pass within 1 LD of Earth in 2015 that was discovered more than a week before closest approach. See List of asteroid close approaches to Earth in 2015.

References

External links 
 
 
 

Minor planet object articles (unnumbered)
20150118
20150127